Dadalı is a village in Tarsus district of Mersin Province, Turkey. It is situated in the Çukurova plains between the Çukurova motorway and Berdan Dam. The population of the village was 216 as of 2012.

References

Villages in Tarsus District